Alexandru Roșu (born 30 April 1987) is a Romanian weightlifter. Rosu represented Romania at the 2008 Summer Olympics in Beijing, where he competed for the men's lightweight class (69 kg). Unfortunately, Rosu did not finish the event, as he successfully lifted  in the single-motion snatch, but failed to hoist  in the two-part, shoulder-to-overhead clean and jerk.

References

External links
 
 

1987 births
Living people
Romanian male weightlifters
Olympic weightlifters of Romania
Weightlifters at the 2008 Summer Olympics
European Weightlifting Championships medalists
Sportspeople from Constanța
20th-century Romanian people
21st-century Romanian people